Grosselfingen is a town in the Zollernalbkreis district, in Baden-Württemberg, Germany.

History
In the first half of the 14th century, the village of Grosselfingen was a possession of the Lordship of Haimburg, a fief of the County of Hohenberg and then the County of Zollern. Grosselfingen, which was agrarian before World War II, industrialized after the war. Beginning in 1950, it grew to the north-west and south-east. Continued growth in the 1980s and 1990s spread Grosselfingen further south.

Geography
It is physically located between the rivers Starzel and Eyach, in the foothills of the Swabian Jura.

Coat of arms
Grosselfingen's municipal coat of arms is divided party per cross into four pieces, two black and two white. This pattern is the coat of arms of the County of Zollern, but imposed on it are symbols in the white quarters. In the upper left quarter are two zig-zag red lines, from the coat of arms of the House of Bubenhofen. In the lower right is a blue bird seated on a blue nest. Called the "summer bird" (Sommervogel), this is a reference to the Honourable Court of Fools of Grosselfingen (ehrsame Narrengericht zu Grosselfingen), a local Fastnacht tradition that traces its origin to the rule of the Bubenhofens. The coat of arms was approved by the provisional Württemberg-Hohenzollern government on 13 January 1949. A corresponding flag was issued by the Zollernalb district office on 30 June 1982.

Transportation

Citations

External links
  (in German)